Kezhemsky (masculine), Kezhemskaya (feminine), or Kezhemskoye (neuter) may refer to:
Kezhemsky District, a district of Krasnoyarsk Krai, Russia
Kezhemsky (rural locality), a rural locality (a settlement) in Irkutsk Oblast, Russia